Pittosporum ferrugineum, commonly known as the rusty pittosporum or rusty-leaved pittosporum, is an evergreen plant in the family Pittosporaceae native to Malesia, Papuasia, the Northern Territory and Queensland.

Description
The new growth (twigs, leaves and flowers) is densely covered in fine rusty-brown hairs − giving rise to the common name − but becoming less hairy as it matures.

The dull yellow or orange fruit is a dehiscent 2-valved capsule containing up to 16 small red seeds aggregated into a sticky ball.

Taxonomy
This species was first described − albeit very briefly − and named in 1811 by the English botanist William Townsend Aiton in the book Hortus Kewensis.

Subspecies
There are two subspecies of this taxon recognised by Plants of the World Online (POWO) − P.f. laxiflorum , and the autonym P.f. ferrugineum. An additional subspecies is recognised by World Flora Online − P.f. linifolium .

Etymology
The species epithet ferrugineum is from the Latin ferrugineus, meaning "of the colour of rust", and was given to this species by Aiton in reference to the dense red-brown hairs on the plant.

Distribution and habitat
The rusty-leaved pittosporum is found in Malesia, Papuasia and northern Australia, with records from Malaysia, Borneo, Sulawesi, the Philippines, the Caroline Islands, Java, Sumatra, Lesser Sunda Islands, the Maluku Islands, New Guinea, the Bismark Archipelago, the Solomon Islands, Christmas Island, the Northern Territory and Queensland. It has been introduced to Mauritius, Sri Lanka, Cambodia and Vietnam.

This species is known to inhabit drier rainforest types such as monsoon forest, beach forest and the margins of mangrove forest.

Ecology
The fruit of this species is eaten by metallic starlings (Aplonis metallica). Flowers attract a variety of birds and butterflies.

Conservation
This species is listed by the Queensland Department of Environment and Science as least concern. , it has not been assessed by the IUCN.

Gallery

References

External links
 
 
 View a map of historical sightings of this species at the Australasian Virtual Herbarium
 View observations of this species on iNaturalist
 View images of this species on Flickriver

ferrugineum
Endemic flora of Queensland
Taxa named by William Townsend Aiton
Plants described in 1811